Giancarlo Michele "Carlo" Corazzin (born December 25, 1971) is a Canadian retired professional soccer player who played as a forward for Winnipeg Fury, Vancouver 86ers, Cambridge United, Plymouth Argyle, Northampton Town, Oldham Athletic and Vancouver Whitecaps at club level. At international level, he was capped 59 times for the Canada national team, scoring 11 goals.

Club career
Corazzin began his career with Winnipeg Fury of the Canadian Soccer League in 1992, scoring 10 goals in 24 games and helping the team win the CSL Championship. In 1993, Corazzin signed with the Vancouver Whitecaps of the A-League (now known as the USL First Division, where he finished second in the team's scoring charts with 7 goals in 24 games.

Corazzin signed with Cambridge United of the English Second Division (now known as League 1) on December 10, 1993, scoring 43 goals in 117 games over two-and-a-half seasons. In his final year with Cambridge, the team was relegated, and on March 28, 1996, Corazzin signed with Plymouth Argyle for a transfer fee of £150 000. In two-and-a-half seasons at Argyle, Corazzin scored 24 goals in 86 games.

Corazzin joined Northampton Town of the third division on June 26, 1998, netting 32 goals in 89 games over two seasons. Northampton Town were relegated in 1999, but with Corazzin's help, the club regained promotion in 2000.

Oldham Athletic
On July 28, 2000, after a successful CONCACAF Gold Cup with Canada, Corazzin signed with Oldham Athletic and scored 22 goals in 129 games over three seasons. His finest moment with Oldham came in a match against Wrexham when Corazzin scored 4 in a 5–1 victory in 2001, finishing it off with his trademark celebration "The Carlo Spin". He was also present in the side which made the 2002/03 play-off and scored the winning goal in that season's League Cup against Premiership side West Ham United.

Return to Canada
In 2003, Corazzin re-signed with Vancouver Whitecaps, where he scored 7 goals in a 13-game undefeated streak. Corazzin played with the Whitecaps for 3 years until he was released in 2006.

International career
Corazzin made his Canada national team debut on June 1, 1994, in a 1–1 tie with Morocco. Corazzin scored the majority of his international goals between 1999–2000 and formed an effective striker partnership with Paul Peschisolido for Canada over the years. In 2000, Corazzin won the Golden Boot as top scorer of the CONCACAF Gold Cup with four goals and was named in the best XI of the tournament as Canada won the competition for the first time. Corazzin played in all of Canada's three games at the 2001 FIFA Confederations Cup. Corazzin earned 59 caps for Canada from 1994 to 2004 scoring 11 goals, ranking him tied-seventh in the all-time scoring for Canada. He has represented Canada in 23 FIFA World Cup qualification matches in three FIFA World Cup qualification campaigns (1998, 2002 and 2006) .

His final international cap was an October 2004 World Cup qualification match against Costa Rica, a game which also marked the end of the international careers of Mark Watson and Jason de Vos.

Broadcasting career
In 2012, Corazzin became a soccer analyst on the pre- and post-match shows of Vancouver Whitecaps FC radio broadcasts on The TEAM 1040 in Vancouver.

Personal life
Corazzin is of Italian descent.

Career statistics
Scores and results list Canada's goal tally first, score column indicates score after each Corazzin goal.

Honours
Northampton Town
English Third Division third place (promoted): 1999–2000

Canada
CONCACAF Gold Cup: 2000
CONCACAF Gold Cup Best XI: 2000
CONCACAF Gold Cup Golden Boot: 2000

References

External links
  / Canada Soccer Hall of Fame
 
 

1971 births
Living people
People from New Westminster
Canadian people of Italian descent
Association football forwards
Soccer people from British Columbia
Canadian soccer players
Canadian expatriate soccer players
Canada men's international soccer players
CONCACAF Gold Cup-winning players
1996 CONCACAF Gold Cup players
2000 CONCACAF Gold Cup players
2001 FIFA Confederations Cup players
2003 CONCACAF Gold Cup players
Winnipeg Fury players
Vancouver Whitecaps (1986–2010) players
Cambridge United F.C. players
Plymouth Argyle F.C. players
Northampton Town F.C. players
Oldham Athletic A.F.C. players
Canadian Soccer League (1987–1992) players
American Professional Soccer League players
English Football League players
USL First Division players
Expatriate footballers in England
A-League (1995–2004) players
Canadian expatriate sportspeople in England